The Washington Ballet (TWB) is an ensemble of professional ballet dancers based in Washington DC. It was founded in 1976 by Mary Day, and has been under the artistic directorship of Julie Kent  since 2016. Septime Webre was artistic director for 17 years starting in 1999 and stepped down as artistic director at the conclusion of the 2015/2016 season.

The Mary Day years (1976–99)
Mary Day (née Mary Henry Day; 25 January 1910 – 11 July 2006), a native of Washington, and her mentor, Lisa Gardiner (né Elizabeth C. Gardiner; 1894–1958), established The Washington School of Ballet in 1944.  In the 1950s, a pre-professional group of dancers trained at the school joined to perform at the National Cathedral and the D.C. Department of Recreation with the National Symphony Orchestra. This group also toured New York, West Virginia, and the Dominican Republic, where the troupe performed with Alicia Alonso in 1956.

In 1961, the Washington Ballet School premiered Day's The Nutcracker with the National Symphony Orchestra in Constitution Hall.  In 1976, Day started The Washington Ballet, a company providing a professional showcase for the students of The Washington School of Ballet.  Funded by a grant from the National Endowment for the Arts, Day hired Peter Grigsby as the first administrative director who took advantage of the Department of Labor's Comprehensive Employment and Training Act to hire dancers. He was followed by Alton Miller as director who expanded the touring of the company. The Washington Ballet founding company members included Madelyn Berdes, Patricia Berrend, James Canfield, Sharon Caplan, Robin Conrad, Lynn Cote, Laurie Dameron, John Goding, Robin Hardy, Jon Jackson, Brian Jameson, Terry Lacy, Christine Matthews, Ricardo Mercado, Julie Miles, Patricia Miller, Philip Rosemond, Helen Sumerwell and Allison Zusi.

Resident choreographer Goh
The company's first season consisted of three works by an up-and-coming choreographer/dancer from the Dutch National Ballet, Goh Choo San, who was resident choreographer at the founding of the company and later became associate artistic director. Goh's teaching and choreographic demands in his first two years in Washington DC moved the company from being described as "pre-professional" to solidly professional level, with Mikhail Baryshnikov showing interest in, and eventually dancing with, the company and Goh's choreography in 1979.

In 1980, 17-year-old company member Amanda McKerrow was chosen as one of nine dancers to compete on the official U.S. dance team at the Fourth International Ballet Competition in Moscow. She partnered with Simon Dow and won the gold medal, becoming the first United States citizen to win the competition. During the 1980s and 1990s, The Washington Ballet performed full seasons in Washington, D.C. and toured internationally to China, Japan, Malaysia, Singapore, Russia, Spain, and South America.

During his time at The Washington Ballet until his death in November 1987, Goh choreographed 19 ballets for the company.

Post-Goh years
Mary Day stepped down as artistic director of the company in 1999 and retired as school director in 2003. She died in 2006.

The Septime Webre years (1999-2016)
In 1999, Septime Webre, a Cuban-American, joined The Washington Ballet as the artistic director.  Works created for the Washington Ballet by Webre include Juanita y Alicia (2000), Carmen (2001), Journey Home (2002), Cinderella (2003), Oui/Non (2006), and State of Wonder (2006), as well as Carmina Burana, Fluctuating Hemlines, Where the Wild Things Are, and Peter Pan. The company has staged the works of such contemporary choreographers as George Balanchine, Twyla Tharp, Christopher Wheeldon, Mark Morris, Trey McIntyre, Edwaard Liang, and Nacho Duato, in addition to the more classical ballets, like Giselle, Coppélia, and La Sylphide.  In October 2000, Webre led The Washington Ballet on an historic tour of Havana, making it the first American ballet company to perform in Cuba since 1960.  In 2004, the Washington Ballet premiered Webre's The Nutcracker.  Webre created his takes on The Great Gatsby in 2010 and The Sun Also Rises in 2013.

Webre also initiated DanceDC, the Washington Ballet's outreach and education program that combines creative movement with an integrated language arts curriculum for D.C. public school children.  Classical pre-ballet technique is taught to interested DanceDC students through a unique scholarship program called EXCEL!  Nine boys and nine girls from the DanceDC schools are selected annually to receive on-site professional ballet technique training for an hour once a week at The Washington School of Ballet.  In 2005, the company began The Washington Ballet at the Town Hall Education, Arts and Recreation Campus (TWB@THEARC), a home to community programs by the company as well as a branch of the Washington School of Ballet east of the Anacostia River.

Julie Kent (2016-)
In February 2016, Webre announced he'd be stepping down at the end of June. A month later, the company announced Julie Kent, recently retired after dancing with the American Ballet Theatre for 29 years, would take the company's reins starting July 1. Now under the artistic directorship of Julie Kent, her long-term focus and vision for The Washington Ballet is using its solid foundation to further develop and build the institution by broadening company repertoire, expanding community engagement efforts throughout the DC metropolitan area and leading TWB to a more prominent place both within and beyond the nation's capital. In addition to being an iconic ballerina, Kent has the distinction as the longest-serving dancer at American Ballet Theatre, having danced with the company for 29 years. Her extensive roles encompass the breadth of the ballet repertoire and as a muse to choreographers who created works on her.   Her continued devotion to serving the art form, to promoting arts education and to using her experience to nurture, train and develop the next generation of dancers are the tenets by which she will further elevate TWB and its company, school and community engagement programs and initiatives.

Repertoire

Company
The dancers for the company are:

 Victoria Arrea
 Katherine Barkman
 Nardia Boodoo
 Kimberly Cilento
 Adelaide Clauss
 Gilles Delellio
 Kateryna Derechyna
 Jessy Dick
 Nicole Graniero
 Sona Kharatian
 Ayano Kimura
 Tamas Krizsa
 EunWon Lee
 Lope Lim
 Ariel Martinez
 Tamako Miyazaki
 Javier Morera
 Ashley Murphy-Wilson
 Stephen Nakagawa 
 Andile Ndlovu
 Lucy Nevin
 Maki Onuki
 Gian Carlo Perez
 Samara Rittinger
 Daniel Roberge
 Oscar Sanchez
 Stephanie Sorota
 Sarah Steele 
 Brittany Stone
 Masanori Takiguchi
 Alexa Torres

The dancers for the studio company are:
 Andrea Allmon
 Peyton Bond
 Rafael Bejarano
 Nicholas Cowden
 Abigail Granlund
 Audrey Malek
 Helga Paris Morales
 Rachel Rohrich
 Noura Sander
 Rench Soriano

References

External links
 
 The Washington Ballet's Facebook page
Archival footage of The Washington Ballet performing Choo-San Goh's Double Contrasts in 1980 at Jacob’s Pillow Dance Festival.

Ballet companies in the United States
Members of the Cultural Alliance of Greater Washington
1976 establishments in Washington, D.C.
Performing groups established in 1976
Dance in Washington, D.C.
Non-profit organizations based in Washington, D.C.